III – Odyssey of the Mind is the sixth album by the German band Die Krupps. It was released in 1995.

Track listing

Personnel 
Die Krupps

 Jürgen Engler – vocals, keyboards, metal percussion, guitar
 Lee Altus – guitars
 Chris Lietz – drum programming
 Ralf Dörper – samples
 Rüdiger Esch – bass guitar

Technical personnel

 Tony Platt – mixing
 Frank Duchêne – assistant mixing
 John Cremer – mastering
 Mary Buck – cover
 Igor Tillmann – 3D cover photography, photos
 Thomas Ecke – band photo

Chart positions

References 

1995 albums
Die Krupps albums
Rough Trade Records albums